The 2011 European Weightlifting Championships was held in Kazan, Russia from 11 April to 17 April 2011. It was the 90th edition of the event, which was first staged in 1896.

Schedule
MONDAY 11, APRIL
10.00-11.30 Women / 48 kg / Group B
12.00-14.00 Men / 56 kg / Group B
16.00-16.30 OPENING CEREMONY
17.00-19.00 Women / 48 kg / Group A final
20.00-22.00 Men / 56 kg / Group A final
TUESDAY 12, APRIL
12.00-13.30 Women / 53 kg / Group B
14.00-16.00 Men / 62 kg / Group B
17.00-19.00 Women / 53 kg / Group A
20.00-22.00 Men / 62 kg / Group A
WEDNESDAY 13, APRIL
12.00-13.30 Women / 58 kg / Group B
14.00-16.00 Men / 69 kg / Group B
17.00-19.00 Women / 58 kg / Group A final
20.00-22.00 Men / 69 kg / Group A final
THURSDAY 14, APRIL
10.00-12.00 Men / 85 kg / Group C
12.00-13.30 Women / 63 kg / Group B
14.00-16.00 Men / 77 kg / Group B
17.00-19.00 Women / 63 kg / Group A
20.00-22.00 Men / 77 kg / Group A
FRIDAY 15, APRIL
10.00-11.30 Women / 69 kg / Group B
11.30-13.30 Men / 94 kg / Group B
14.00-16.00 Men / 85 kg / Group B
17.00-19.00 Women / 69 kg / Group A final
20.00-22.00 Men / 85 kg / Group A final
SATURDAY 16, APRIL
09.30-11.00 Women / 75 kg / Group B
11.00-13.00 Men / 105 kg / Group B
14.00-16.00 Men / 94 kg / Group A
17.00-19.00 Women / 75 kg / Group A
20.00-22.00 Men / 105 kg / Group A
SUNDAY 17, APRIL
09.30-11.00 Women / +75 kg / Group B
11.00-13.00 Men / +105 kg / Group B
14.00-16.00 Women / +75 kg / Group A final
17.00-19.00 Men / +105 kg / Group A final
20.30 CLOSING CEREMONY & BANQUET

Medal overview

Men

Women

Medals tables 

Ranking by all medals: "Big" (Total result) and "Small" (Snatch and Clean&Jerk)

Ranking by "Big" (Total result) medals

References

External links 
 
 IWF results 

E
European Weightlifting Championships
European Weightlifting Championships
European Weightlifting Championships
European Weightlifting Championships
European Weightlifting Championships
Weightlifting in Russia